Valfajar (also Romanized as Vālfajar; also known as Gorbeh, Gorbeh’ī (Persian: گربه اي), Gowrbeh, and Gurbehi) is a village in Liravi-ye Miyani Rural District of Imam Hassan District of Deylam County, Bushehr province, Iran. At the 2006 census, its population was 201 in 39 households. The following census in 2011 counted 173 people in 39 households. The latest census in 2016 showed a population of 138 people in 32 households; it was the largest village in its rural district.

References 

Populated places in Deylam County